Polar Bear may refer to:
Polar bear, a species of bear

Film
Polar Bears (film), a 2008 Nickelodeon television movie
Polar Bears: A Summer Odyssey, a 2012 Canadian documentary
Polar Bear (film), a 2022 Disneynature documentary

Music

Groups and labels
Polar Bear (American band), a rock band from Los Angeles
Polar Bear (British band), a jazz band
Polar Bears (band), a rock band from northern California
Snow Patrol or Polarbear, a Scottish alternative rock band

Albums
Polar Bear (EP), a 1996 EP by the American band Polar Bear
Polar Bear (album), a 2008 album by the British jazz band Polar Bear

Songs
"Polar Bear", a 1990 song by Ride from Nowhere
"Polar Bear", a song by Smile, later recorded by Queen
"Polar Bear", a 2004 song by Therapy? from Never Apologise Never Explain

Other uses
Polar Bears (play), a 2010 British play by Mark Haddon
Polar Bear (cocktail)
Polar Bear (furniture), a sofa and armchair complect designed in 1940s
Polar Bear (locomotive), a Bagnall steam locomotive built in 1905 for the Groudle Glen Railway
POLARBEAR, a CMB polarimetry experiment in the Atacama Desert
Polar-bearing or knockout game, an assault in which, one or more assailants attempt to knock out an unsuspecting victim
Edese Zwem- & Poloclub Polar Bears, a Netherlands water polo team
Polar Bear Expedition, a U.S. troop contingent 1918–19
Polar Bear Pass, a pass on Bathurst Island, Nunavut, Canada
31st Infantry Regiment (United States), also known as Polar Bears
Polar Bear (schooner), a ship purchased for the Canadian Arctic Expedition, 1913–1916
Polar Bear, a nickname for Hugh Rowland in Ice Road Truckers
Polar Bear, a white-bearded or gray-bearded member of the Bear community in gay culture
Polar Bear Memorial, a commemorative bear sculpture at White Chapel Memorial Cemetery in Troy, Michigan

See also
HMS Protector (A173) or Polarbjørn, a research ship and icebreaker
L'Ours Blanc, a marble sculpture of a polar bear by François Pompon
Polar bear plunge, a type of fundraiser